In mathematics, a half-integer is a number of the form 

where  is a whole number. For example, 

are all half-integers. The name "half-integer" is perhaps misleading, as the set may be misunderstood to include numbers such as 1 (being half the integer 2). A name such as "integer-plus-half" may be more accurate, but even though not literally true, "half integer" is the conventional term. Half-integers occur frequently enough in mathematics and in quantum mechanics that a distinct term is convenient.

Note that halving an integer does not always produce a half-integer; this is only true for odd integers. For this reason, half-integers are also sometimes called half-odd-integers. Half-integers are a subset of the dyadic rationals (numbers produced by dividing an integer by a power of two).

Notation and algebraic structure
The set of all half-integers is often denoted 

The integers and half-integers together form a group under the addition operation, which may be denoted

However, these numbers do not form a ring because the product of two half-integers is often not a half-integer; e.g.

Properties
The sum of  half-integers is a half-integer if and only if  is odd. This includes  since the empty sum 0 is not half-integer.
The negative of a half-integer is a half-integer.
The cardinality of the set of half-integers is equal to that of the integers. This is due to the existence of a bijection from the integers to the half-integers: , where  is an integer

Uses

Sphere packing
The densest lattice packing of unit spheres in four dimensions (called the D4 lattice) places a sphere at every point whose coordinates are either all integers or all half-integers. This packing is closely related to the Hurwitz integers: quaternions whose real coefficients are either all integers or all half-integers.

Physics
In physics, the Pauli exclusion principle results from definition of fermions as particles which have spins that are half-integers.

The energy levels of the quantum harmonic oscillator occur at half-integers and thus its lowest energy is not zero.

Sphere volume
Although the factorial function is defined only for integer arguments, it can be extended to fractional arguments using the gamma function. The gamma function for half-integers is an important part of the formula for the volume of an -dimensional ball of radius ,

The values of the gamma function on half-integers are integer multiples of the square root of pi:

where  denotes the double factorial.

References

Rational numbers
Elementary number theory
Parity (mathematics)